Andando nas Nuvens (English: Walking on Clouds) is a Brazilian telenovela produced and broadcast by TV Globo which originally ran from March 22 to November 5, 1999, for 197 episodes.

Cast

Supporting cast
 Marcos Oliveira as Vantuir
 José Dartagnan as Arnon
 Andressa Koetz as Hannah
 Luciana Migliaccio as Gisela
 Karla Karenina as Iracema
 Nilton Bicudo as Rolando Bicalho
 Otávio Domit as Mário Bernardo
 Jorge Neves as Serginho
 Ary Coslov as Gregório Montana / waiter
 Guil Silveira as Maitre D'
 Milton Gonçalves as Delegado Serafim
 Dennis Carvalho as Almirante (voice)

Awards 
 Prêmio Jornal dos Clubes
 Revelation: Mariana Ximenes
Magnífico Award
 Revelation: Mariana Ximenes
 Prêmio Qualidade Brasil
 Biggest revelation: Mariana Ximenes
 Melhores do Ano
 Best actor: Marco Nanini

References

External links 
 

1999 telenovelas
Brazilian telenovelas
1999 Brazilian television series debuts
1999 Brazilian television series endings
TV Globo telenovelas
Television shows set in Rio de Janeiro (city)
Portuguese-language telenovelas